The 1939 Mississippi State Teachers Yellow Jackets football team was an American football team that represented the Mississippi State Teachers College (now known as the University of Southern Mississippi) as a member of the Southern Intercollegiate Athletic Association during the 1939 college football season. In their third year under head coach Reed Green, the team compiled a 4–2–3 record.

Schedule

References

Mississippi State Teachers
Southern Miss Golden Eagles football seasons
Mississippi State Teachers Yellow Jackets football